Hebert Efraín Estuardo Alférez Popoca (born 4 June 1988) is a former forward who last played for Loros UdeC on Ascenso MX.

Career
Alférez began his playing career in the Atlas youth teams in 2006. After an impressive performance for Académicos in 5 games, he was called up to the first team and made his professional debut for Atlas on 1 October 2006 in a 1–1 tie against Santos Laguna. He made sporadic appearances thereafter, including one later that season in the Apertura 2006 quarterfinal against América.

He later played for Atlas' Segunda División Profesional, captaining the side to the quarterfinals and semifinals in two seasons. For the Apertura 2008 tournament, he was loaned to Dorados de Sinaloa, where he became a mainstay in the midfield.

For the Apertura 2009 season, Hebert returned to Atlas, promptly re-debuting for the Zorros in the 2009 SuperLiga, against the Kansas City Wizards in a 0–0 draw.

On 10 August 2011 Alférez was transferred on loan to Croatian club HNK Rijeka. Ten days after he debuted against NK Lokomotiva. Alférez scored his only goal on Croatia against NK Zadar on 11 September.

On 14 December 2011 Alférez was transferred to Mexican club Atlante FC. After a short spell playing for Atlante, Alférez continued playing in Lobos BUAP and Zacatepec FC

External links
 
 
 
 
 

1988 births
Living people
Footballers from Quintana Roo
Association football midfielders
Mexican footballers
Atlas F.C. footballers
Dorados de Sinaloa footballers
HNK Rijeka players
Atlante F.C. footballers
Lobos BUAP footballers
Mexican expatriate footballers
Expatriate footballers in Croatia
Mexican expatriate sportspeople in Croatia
Liga MX players
Croatian Football League players